Pennsylvania State Senate District 46 includes part of Beaver County and all of Greene County and Washington County. It is currently represented by Republican Camera Bartolotta.

District profile
The district includes the following areas:

Beaver County:
 Frankfort Springs
 Hanover Township
 Independence Township

All of Greene County

All of Washington County

Senators

Recent election results

References

Pennsylvania Senate districts
Government of Beaver County, Pennsylvania
Government of Greene County, Pennsylvania
Government of Washington County, Pennsylvania